The following is a list of Michigan State Historic Sites in St. Joseph County, Michigan. Sites marked with a dagger (†) are also listed on the National Register of Historic Places in St. Joseph County, Michigan.


Current listings

See also
 National Register of Historic Places listings in St. Joseph County, Michigan

Sources
 Historic Sites Online – "St. Joseph" County. Michigan State Housing Developmental Authority. Accessed June 1, 2011.
 Historic Sites Online – "Saint Joseph" County. Michigan State Housing Developmental Authority. Accessed June 1, 2011.

References

Saint Joseph County
State Historic Sites